Grouse Mountain is located on the border of Kern County and Ventura County a few miles south southwest of the community of Pine Mountain Club at an elevation of . The summit is in Kern County. The mountain is in the Chumash Wilderness which is administered by the Los Padres National Forest.

References 

Transverse Ranges
Mountains of Kern County, California
Mountains of Ventura County, California
Mountains of Southern California